N-acetylgalactosamine 4-sulfate 6-O-sulfotransferase (GalNAc4S-6ST, CHST15 (gene)) is an enzyme with systematic name 3'-phosphoadenylyl-sulfate:(dermatan)-4-O-sulfo-N-acetyl-D-galactosamine 6-O-sulfotransferase. This enzyme catalyses the following chemical reaction

 (1) 3-phospho-5-adenylyl sulfate + [dermatan]-4-O-sulfo-N-acetyl-D-galactosamine  adenosine 3',5'-bisphosphate + [dermatan]-4,6-di-O-sulfo-N-acetyl-D-galactosamine
 (2) 3-phospho-5-adenylyl sulfate + [chondroitin]-4-O-sulfo-N-acetyl-D-galactosamine  adenosine 3',5'-bisphosphate + [chondroitin]-4,6-di-O-sulfo-N-acetyl-D-galactosamine

The enzyme is activated by divalent cations and reduced glutathione.

Human proteins containing this domain
CHST15

References

External links 
 

EC 2.8.2